The village of Ballachulish (  or  , from Scottish Gaelic  ) in Lochaber, Highland, Scotland, is centred on former slate quarries. The name Ballachulish (Ballecheles, 1522 – Straits town) was more correctly applied to the area now called North Ballachulish, to the north of Loch Leven, but was usurped for the quarry villages at East Laroch and West Laroch, either side of the River Laroch, which were actually within Glencoe and South Ballachulish respectively.

Overview 

The principal industry is now tourism.

The name Ballachulish (from Scottish Gaelic, Baile a' Chaolais) means "the Village by the Narrows". The narrows in question is Caolas Mhic Phàdraig – Peter or Patrick's son's narrows, at the mouth of Loch Leven.

As there was no road to the head of Loch Leven until 1927, the Ballachulish Ferry, established in 1733, and those at Invercoe/Callert and Caolas na Con were essential. The Ballachulish ferry closed in December 1975 when the Ballachulish Bridge finally opened.

Ballachulish House was reputed to be haunted, and the drive leading to it was ridden by a headless horseman.

The hamlet of Glenachulish lies in Gleann a' Chaolais, the glen that runs down to the narrows. This is the subject of the Gaelic song, Gleann Bhaile Chaoil written by John Cameron (1865–1951) and known locally both as the Paisley Bard and by his local nickname Iain Cealaidh. He is often confused with another local bard also called John Cameron, known locally as Iain Rob (1822–1898). Gleann a' Chaolais is ringed by Beinn a' Bheithir, a massif which contains two munros - Sgorr Dhearg and Sgorr Dhonuill. In recent years a number of new houses have been built locally along with holiday chalets and an art gallery. Also the fields of Gleann a' Chaolais have been turned into the 9-hole Dragon's Tooth golf course.

Overlooking the narrows is the monument to James of the Glen, "hanged on this spot for a crime of which he was not guilty". Robert Louis Stevenson based his novel Kidnapped around the story of the Appin Murder. Whoever did kill The Red Fox (Campbell of Glenure) is still not known.

Shinty 

Shinty is a popular local sport and the narrows is the traditional boundary of the north–south divide in shinty, with teams north of narrows playing in the North district's competitions and those South playing in their respective competitions. Ballachulish Camanachd Club play in the South Leagues. However, Ballachulish is still considerably far North in relation to most of Scotland.  The club has won the Camanachd Cup four times.

Railway 

Traces of the line, which closed in 1966, remain between here and Connel Ferry. The old terminus station at Laroch (Ballachulish) is now a doctor's surgery. The station at Kentallen ( south of Ballachulish) included a pier. When the Oban-Ballachulish branch line closed, the station buildings were bought over by Scottie & Bridget Stewart who ran the renowned Kentallen Station Tearooms for more than 15 years until finally retiring in 1974. Afternoon tea served here was a spectacular feast according to visitors books from the day. This station has now been turned into The Holly Tree Hotel & Leisure Club. Much of the old railway line has been re-used as part of National Cycle Route 78, once again giving the beautiful views previously seen from the train.

Slate 

Slate from the East Laroch quarries, established just two years after the infamous Glencoe Massacre of 1692, was used to provide the roofing slate for much of Edinburgh and Glasgow's skyline in the succeeding centuries. It is of good quality but one weakness is the presence of Iron Pyrite in the rock. These crystals quickly rust away when exposed to the weather, leaving clean square holes and a brown rusty streak. Over 75% of the slate cut from the quarries was unusable as roof covering for this and other reasons. In 1955 the quarries closed. Leaving Slate waste mountains in their wake for the then abruptly unemployed and quickly impoverished villagers to sort out.

Between 1902 and 1905 the Ballachulish community was badly affected by two protracted conflicts in the slate quarries. The first began in July 1902, involved a twelve months lockout, and lasted eighteen months. The workers objected to the summary dismissal of the medical officer Dr. Lachlan Grant from both his work in the quarries and his post as Medical Officer for the Parish Council District of Ballachulish. They also objected to the unsatisfactory labour contracts, inadequate wages and excessive charges for the powder, coals and other materials supplied by the company.
The second dispute started in the summer of 1905 when members of a hostile crowd charged the quarry manager with autocratic, dictatorial and unfair behaviour towards both Dr. Grant and members of the quarrying labour force and the community.
A new company was formed in December 1907 and quarrying continued at Ballachulish until 1955.

Local Highland Games

Graveyard 
The graveyard of the former St John's Episcopal Church has an "exceptional collection of 19th-century finely inscribed and carved" gravestones made from Ballachulish slate.

See also
 Cameron of Lochiel
 Clan Cameron
 Eilean Munde

References

Populated places in Lochaber
Slate industry in the United Kingdom